Manian (also Romanized as Mānīān, Māneyān, and Mānīyān) is a village in Jolgah Rural District, in the Central District of Jahrom County, Fars Province, Iran. At the 2006 census, its population was 663, in 141 families.

References 

Populated places in Jahrom County